Cmolas  is a village in Kolbuszowa County, Subcarpathian Voivodeship, in south-eastern Poland. It is the seat of the gmina (administrative district) called Gmina Cmolas.

The village has a population of 3,000.

References

Cmolas